The Connecticut Journal was a newspaper published in New Haven, Connecticut from 1775 to 1835 by Thomas and Samuel Green as well as others. The paper had various names during its existence including the Connecticut Journal and Advertiser. The publishers also printed pamphlets including sermons and the "criminal confession" written by David Daggett about Joseph Mountain, an African American man executed in New Haven before a crowd of thousands of spectators. It was sold amongst the crowd and was a popular and influential treatise.

Thomas Green published several of Connecticut's earliest newspapers.

In 1987 the paper was absorbed by the New Haven Register.

See also
List of newspapers in Connecticut

References

Defunct newspapers published in Connecticut